Ambroży is a Polish surname and given name. Notable people with the name include:

 Sándor Ambrózy (1903–1992), Hungarian sculptor
 Wenzel Bernhard Ambrozy (1723–1806), Czech painter
 Ambroży Augustyn Chevreux (1728–1792), French Benedictine
 Ambroży Kleks or Pan Kleks (Mr. Inkblot), a fictional character in the novel series by Polish writer Jan Brzechwa
 Ambroży Mieroszewski (1802–1884), Polish painter
 Ambroży Mikołaj Skarżyński of Bończa (1787–1868), Napoleonic officer, Chevalier de l'Empire and Polish general

See also
 Ambrose (disambiguation), the English equivalent of Ambroży
 Amvrosy, a Russian name